Salarzai Tehsil is a subdivision located in Bajaur District, Khyber Pakhtunkhwa, Pakistan. The population is 268,517 according to the 2017 census.

See also 
 Chachagai
 List of tehsils of Khyber Pakhtunkhwa
 anjuro banda

References 

Tehsils of Khyber Pakhtunkhwa
Populated places in Bajaur District